Furore is a town and comune in the province of Salerno in the Campania region of south-western Italy. Furore is located on the Amalfi Coast.

Geography
The municipality of Furore expands from sea level, where there is the hamlet of Fiordo di Furore, and a little civil parish partly belonging to Praiano named Marina di Praia, up to Agerola (550 meters above sea level). The village is subdivided into 3 districts (contrade): Cicala (Sant'Elia), Ciuccio (Santo Jaco) and Gatta (Sant'Agnelo).

Main sights

the so-called fiordo di Furore, in fact a ria created by the Schiato torrent which flows here from Agerola.
Church of Sant'Elia
 Saint Giacomo Church, with a collection of religious iconography of female Saints.
 Saint Michele Church, with Gothic elements, such as the sharp arch, coexisting with Romanesque figurative decorations.
 The open-air museum of Murals, along the road, painted on the walls of the houses of Furore.

Gallery

See also
Amalfi Coast
Sorrentine Peninsula
Emerald Cave

References

External links

Official website
The nicest villages in Italy 
Furore's Fjord

Cities and towns in Campania
Amalfi Coast
Coastal towns in Campania